Karambola (Collision) is a Philippine political talk radio program. It airs every weekday mornings on DWIZ in Metro Manila, and nationwide via syndication on Home Radio Network (provincial stations) and RPN Radyo Ronda. 

Since 2018, the program has been live streaming through social media platforms such as Facebook and YouTube, as well on the station's official website and mobile application. In May 2022, the program premiered on Aliw Broadcasting Corporation's newest television station IZTV, which is currently conducting test broadcasts.

History

The program was first conceptualized by Aliw Broadcasting Corporation founder and former Ambassador Antonio Cabangon-Chua, as a way to debate and tackle issues on politics, featuring a panel of prominent journalists and broadcasters.

In 2018, blogger RJ Nieto ("Thinking Pinoy") and lawyer Trixie Cruz-Angeles joined the show's third batch. Robles died on May 23, 2019. Senator Imee Marcos and attorney Larry Gadon joined as guest commentators in 2019, while Nieto left the program on August 3, 2020.

Angeles left the program in May 2022 to pursue her role as Secretary of the Presidential Communications Operations Office. Willie Jurado (former chief adviser of Bongbong Marcos), Joel Lacsamana (Manila Standard columnist), and Anna Mae Lamentillo (Manila Bulletin columnist and former chairperson of the Build Build Build committee of the Department of Public Works and Highways) were named as new co-hosts following Cruz-Angeles' departure.

On October 20, 2022, Cruz-Angeles returned to her role as co-host and moderator of the said program, following her departure from the Office of the Press Secretary earlier in the month.

Hosts

Current
 Jonathan Dela Cruz 
 Conrad Banal 
 Trixie Cruz-Angeles 
 Larry Gadon 
 Willie Jurado 
 Joel Lacsamana

Past hosts
 Alvin Capino†
 Teodoro Locsin Jr.
 Jesus Crispin “Boying” Remulla
 Dodo Dulay
 Dong Puno†
 Imee Marcos 
 Ed Javier
 Cely Ortega Bueno
 Cielo Villaluna
 Alex Magno
 Salvador Escudero†
 Tonton Contreras
 Jojo Robles†
 RJ Nieto
 Anna Mae Yu Lamentillo

See also
 DWIZ

References

Philippine radio programs
2005 radio programme debuts